Sakamoto Dam  is a gravity dam located in Kochi Prefecture in Japan. The dam is used for flood control and power production. The catchment area of the dam is 82 km2. The dam impounds about 99  ha of land when full and can store 18150 thousand cubic meters of water. The construction of the dam was started on 1972 and completed in 2000.

See also
List of dams in Japan

References

Dams in Kōchi Prefecture